Nils Gustaf Håkansson, (October 15, 1885 in Helsingborg – June 9, 1987 in Ekerö, Stockholm), became famous as the Stålfarfar ("Super Grandfather" or "Steel grandpa" - from the Swedish name for Superman) after cycling the , a race covering the length of Sweden in July 1951, at 66 years of age.

Life
Håkansson was a resident of Gantofta in Helsingborg, where he drove a bus, while his wife Maria had a café. In 1927, at 42 years of age, he conquered the northern Swedish mountains by bicycle.

Sverigeloppet
In 1951, at 66 years of age, Håkansson participated out-of-competition in the 1764 kilometer bicycle tour Sverigeloppet from Haparanda to Ystad. Because of his advanced age, the organizers had refused  to allow him to participate. The maximum age for race participants was 40 years, but  nevertheless he started from Haparanda, formally not among the contestants but starting one minute after the last of them had set off and wearing a shirt on which he had written a big zero as his number tag. The Tour was run in stages, and while the contestants slept, Håkansson would pedal up to three days without sleeping. During the contest, he was presented as "Stålfarfar", a name that had followed him since the late 1940s. He kept a long flowing white beard that made him look even older, and the organizers were afraid people would laugh at the race participants. Many newspapers were covering his story, and he became famous as the nation followed his journey through the country.

During a few hours off in Söderhamn the police asked him to take a medical exam, which showed that Hakansson was in good health.  After 6 days, 14 hours and 20 minutes, he arrived in Ystad - 24 hours before the contestants. There was a parade with a marching band, fire brigades and Håkansson seated on the shoulders of younger men. The next day he had an audience with King Gustaf VI Adolf of Sweden.

Fame
Håkansson was subsequently paid to appear in adverts, and he toured a long time in the country's folkparks and old people's homes with his religious songs. He made a record at Liseberg, and became known as the world's oldest recording artist at the time.

In 1959, Håkansson rode his bicycle to Jerusalem to visit the holy sites.  His last cycling trips were made after he reached the age of 100 years.

Death

He was almost 102 years old at the time of his death, and his wife Maria, who died a year before Hakansson, almost 105. The couple are buried in Kvistofta cemetery along with a son, who predeceased them.

At Johannamuseet in Skurup, Scania there is a permanent exhibition about "Stålfarfar."

References

1885 births
1987 deaths
People from Helsingborg
Swedish male cyclists
Swedish centenarians
Men centenarians